Chris Hynnes (born August 12, 1970) is a Canadian former professional ice hockey defenseman who was an All-American for Colorado College and led the South Carolina Stingrays to a Kelly Cup championship in 1997.

Career
Hynnes began his college career in 1989 and played sparingly as a freshman. His ice time an production increased significantly beginning with his sophomore season and he continued to grow as a junior, being named an All-American while scoring at a more than point-per-game pace. Despite Hynnes' efforts, Colorado College didn't achieve much success during his time with the team. The Tigers never finished above .500 and missed the NCAA tournament each year.

After graduating, Hynnes began his professional career in one of the lowest leagues in North America, the Colonial Hockey League. He was able to make a name for himself fairly quickly, scoring nearly a point-per-game in his first season as a pro and helping the Thunder Bay Senators win the league championship. The following season he got a shot at AAA hockey, playing more than half the season at the top level of the minor leagues. His production, however, never materialized and he was returned to Thunder Bay where he won a second championship. After helping the Senators to a third consecutive finals appearance (finishing as runners-up in 1996), Hynnes moved over to the ECHL and continued to play well with the South Carolina Stingrays. In his first season with the team he led South Carolina in postseason scoring and helped the club win its first Kelly Cup.

Hynnes spent two more seasons with the Stingrays before plying his trade in Europe. After two fairly disappointing seasons with the Frankfurt Lions, Hynnes retired from the game.

Statistics

Regular season and playoffs

Awards and honors

References

External links

1970 births
Living people
AHCA Division I men's ice hockey All-Americans
Canadian ice hockey defencemen
Ice hockey people from Ontario
Sportspeople from Thunder Bay
Colorado College Tigers men's ice hockey players
Thunder Bay Senators players
Minnesota Moose players
Prince Edward Island Senators players
South Carolina Stingrays players
Portland Pirates players
Rochester Americans players
Frankfurt Lions players
National Hockey League supplemental draft picks
Quebec Nordiques draft picks